The 2020 Menards.com 200 Presented by SPxE was the ninth stock car race of the 2020 ARCA Menards Series, the fourth race of the 2020 Sioux Chief Showdown, and the first of two back-to-back races of the weekend. The race was held on Friday, July 31, 2020,  in Toledo, Ohio, at Toledo Speedway, a 0.5 miles (0.80 km) permanent oval-shaped racetrack. The race took the scheduled 200 laps to complete. At race's end, Sam Mayer of GMS Racing would dominate the late stages of the race to win his first career ARCA Menards Series win and his first win of the season. To fill out the podium, Ty Gibbs of Joe Gibbs Racing and Taylor Gray of DGR-Crosley would finish second and third, respectively.

Background 
Toledo Speedway opened in 1960 and was paved in 1964. In 1978 it was sold to Thomas "Sonny" Adams Sr. The speedway was reacquired by ARCA in 1999. The track also features the weekly racing divisions of sportsman on the half-mile and Figure 8, factory stock, and four cylinders on a quarter-mile track inside the big track. They also have a series of races with outlaw-bodied late models that includes four 100-lap races and ends with Glass City 200. The track hosts the “Fastest short track show in the world” which features winged sprints and winged Super Modifieds on the half mile. Toledo also used to host a 200-lap late model race until its sale to ARCA in 1999.

Toledo is known for the foam blocks that line the race track, different than the concrete walls that line many short tracks throughout America. The crumbling walls can make track cleanup a tedious task for workers.

Entry list

Practice 
The only 45-minute practice session was held on Friday, July 31.

Qualifying 
Qualifying was held on Friday, July 31, at 6:30 PM EST. Qualifying was a single car, two lap system where the first lap would determine the starting the starting position for Friday's race, and the second lap would determine the starting the starting position for Saturday's race.

Race results

References 

2020 ARCA Menards Series
July 2020 sports events in the United States
2020 in sports in Ohio